Trachypepla roseata is a species of moth in the family Oecophoridae. This species is endemic to New Zealand and is found in the Nelson and Tasman regions of the South Island. It frequents forest habitat and is on the wing in January. It is classified as "Data Deficient" by the Department of Conservation.

Taxonomy 
It was described by Alfred Philpott in 1923 using a specimen he collected at the Dun Mountain in Nelson in January. George Hudson had previously discovered the species in Tākaka. Hudson discussed and illustrated this species in his 1928 publication The Butterflies and Moths of New Zealand. The holotype is held at the New Zealand Arthropod Collection.

Description 

Philpott described the species as follows:

Distribution 

This species is endemic to New Zealand. This species has been collected at its type locality of the Dun Mountain at a height of approximately 600 m above sea-level, at Tākaka and at Wairoa Gorge, all in the Nelson and Tasman areas.

Biology and behaviour 
The adults of this species are on the wing in January.

Habitat 
This species frequents forest habitat.

Conservation Status 
This species has been classified as having the "Data Deficient" conservation status under the New Zealand Threat Classification System.

References

Moths described in 1923
Oecophoridae
Moths of New Zealand
Endemic fauna of New Zealand
Endemic moths of New Zealand